Spike sorting is a class of techniques used in the analysis of electrophysiological data. Spike sorting algorithms use the shape(s) of waveforms collected with one or more electrodes in the brain to distinguish the activity of one or more neurons from background electrical noise.

Neurons produce action potentials that are referred to as 'spikes' in laboratory jargon. Frequently this term is used for electrical signals recorded in the vicinity of individual neurons with a microelectrode (exception: 'spikes' in EEG recordings). In these recordings action potentials appear as sharp spikes (deviations from the baseline). These extracellular electrodes pick up all the components constituting the field at the point of its contact. This includes the component due to the synaptic currents and the action potentials. The synaptic currents have slower time course and the spikes have faster time course. They are thus easily separated by filtering: highpass for spikes and low pass for the synaptic mechanisms. The component of the field due to the synaptic mechanism is referred to as the local field potential (LFP).  Spike sorting refers to the process of assigning spikes to different neurons. The background to this is that the exact time course of a spike event as recorded by the electrode depends on the size and shape of the neuron, the position of the recording electrode relative to the neuron, etc. These electrodes, positioned outside of the cells in the tissue, however, often 'see' the spikes generated by several neurons in their vicinity. Since the spike shapes are unique and quite reproducible for each neuron they can be used to distinguish spikes produced by different neurons, i.e. to separate the activity produced by each.

Technically this is often achieved based on different sizes of the spikes (simple but inaccurate version) or more sophisticated analyses which make use of the entire waveform of the spikes. The techniques often use tools such as principal components or wavelet analysis.

Multiple electrodes record different waveforms for each individual spike elicited by the neurons in the vicinity of the electrodes. The geometric configuration of the electrodes can then be used to define additional dimensions to analyze which spikes originated from which individual cell in the recorded population of cells. Thus the spike sorting using multiple electrodes is better than sorting based simply on waveform shape.  The most popular setup involves the use of four micro electrodes, called 'tetrodes' (different from the vacuum tube Tetrode), though more electrodes may be used. Recording electrodes can be metal wires or fine print on a PCB with gold or platinum plated at their exposed tips to ensure good contact and prevent change in resistance while the experiment is going on.

Principal Component weights of spikes from two different neurons

Spike shapes colored according to their assignment to different neurons. The blue trace could not be assigned unequivocally.

See also
 Spike sorting article in Scholarpedia

Electrophysiology
Neurophysiology
Articles containing video clips